The 2008–09 Coppa Italia di calcio femminile was the 37th edition of the Italian women's football national cup. ASDCF Bardolino defeated defending champion Torres CF in a rematch of the previous edition's final to win its third title.

First stage

Group A

Group B

Group C

Group D

Group E

Group F

Group G

Group H

Quarterfinals

|}

Final four

Semifinals

Final

References

Italian Women's Cup seasons
2008–09 in Italian women's football
Wom